Shah Abdul Latif University (abbreviated as SALU), is a public research university located in rural Khairpur of Sindh, Pakistan.  The university is named after the mystic poet and spiritualist Shah Abdul Latif Bhittai.

The university also maintains teaching campuses in Shikarpur, Shahdadkot and Ghotki.  Founded in 1976 as a single campus, the university has grown in both keeping its reputation and physical enlargement whilst developing a strong and transparent system of higher education in the north of Sindh. The university offers undergraduate, post-graduate, and doctorate programmes in various academic disciplines.  The university is noted for its academic staff consisting of foreign scholars, and research directed towards the development of humanities, archaeology, Sindh studies, natural and social sciences.

In addition, it is ranked as one of the top institution of high learning by the HEC on "general" category. its ranking as per country rank is 97 in Pakistan and world rank 7968.  Nearly ~7000 students currently enrolled in the university, the university's main focus is committed to enabling its graduates to lead and serve the nation apart from their own better well-being.

History

Initial foundation
In 1974-75 the University of Sindh with its solitary campus in Jamshoro could not keep pace with the growing need of the Sindh Province for higher education. Another campus was therefore set up at Khairpur Mirs, named after the national poet of Sindh, Shah Abdul Latif Bhitai. The campus was meant to provide higher education facilities in various modern and scientific fields to the people in the northern part of the Province of Sindh, which had a rich tradition of producing highly educated and intelligent people.

Full university status
In 1986, the Sindh provincial assembly passed an act to make the campus a full-fledged and independent university. The act came into force in 1987, making the university functional, under then-Chief Minister Ghous Ali Shah. The landscape includes three canals nearby which serve as picnic spots for the students and the faculty. The university has over 4,000 students in various programmes. There are 3,500 undergraduate and 1,500 graduate students. About 75 percent of students are male and 25 percent female. Despite seven student hostels (including three for females), the university has also provided an arranged-transport facility for students, and the majority of them commute daily from their homes. The university is ranked at number twenty in the general category of the Higher Education Commission of Pakistan rankings.

Research
To encourage research, the university has established:
 
 Directorate of Research 
 Indus Development Research Centre 
 Sachal Chair 
 Sheikh Ayaz Chair 
 Women Chair 
 Pir Syed Muhammad Rashid Shah Chair
 Herbarium and Botanical Garden, Shah Abdul Latif University
 Centre for Biodiversity and Conservation

 Shaheed Mohtrma Benazir Bhutto Chair.

Faculties
The University has 31 Departments, for the Study and Research of different fields of Science and Arts.

The university comprises the following faculties: 

 Faculty of Arts 
 Faculty of Commerce & Business Administration 
 Faculty of Law 
 Faculty of Science 
 Faculty of Student Affairs
 Faculty of Education
Faculty of Physcial Science

The teaching programmes under the Faculty of Law are conducted exclusively through affiliated professional Law colleges. The university teaching departments, institutions and centers offer programmes leading to the award of four-year Bachelor's degrees and two-year Master's degrees equivalent as MPhil. The university also offers PhD degrees in various disciplines.

The two-year bachelor's (Pass) degree programmes are conducted through various affiliated degree colleges within the jurisdiction of the university. Post-graduate degree (Masters) classes in specific disciplines are also conducted in specified Degree College.

The university is recognised by the Pakistan Bar Council and the LL.B. degree of the University is recognised as a qualifying law degree for an individual to be admitted to a Bar in Pakistan.

Gallery

See also

 List of universities in Pakistan
Syed Ali Aslam Jafri

References

External links 
 SALU official website

1986 establishments in Pakistan
Educational institutions established in 1986
Shah Abdul Latif University